Kirby is a rural hamlet located in the Municipality of Clarington in Durham Region in Ontario, Canada. On Highway 35/115, it is north of Orono, approximately a 45-minute drive east of Toronto. The community is named for Kirkby, North Yorkshire.

The hamlet also features the Kirby United Church, although services are not held there anymore.

Schools 
Kirby Public School is the elementary school in the area. In 2017, Kirby School was absorbed by Orono Public School.

References

Neighbourhoods in Clarington